The District of Highlands (locally known as "the Highlands") is a district municipality near Victoria, British Columbia, Canada. As one of the Western Communities, or West Shore municipalities, outside Victoria, Highlands has a population of 2,225 as of 2016. The region stretches along the Saanich Inlet shoreline from north of Goldstream to Mackenzie Bight. Highlands is one of the more undeveloped areas of the Greater Victoria region; it is one of the newest Greater Victoria municipalities created within the Capital Regional District.

Although the area is seen as a target for residential expansion of the Greater Victoria region, it is known mainly for its lakes, hills, and wilderness. It is home to many parks, notably large portions of Gowlland Tod Provincial Park, Mount Work Regional Park, and Lone Tree Hill Regional Park.

The nearest commercial shopping areas are in the adjacent municipality of Langford. Public education is provided by the Sooke School District's elementary, middle, and secondary schools in Langford.

Demographics 

Religion 
According to the 2021 census, religious groups in Highlands included:
Irreligion (2,010 persons or 75.4%)
Christianity (605 persons or 22.7%)
Judaism (10 persons or 0.4%)
Other (35 persons or 1.3%)

References

External links

District municipalities in British Columbia
Populated places in the Capital Regional District
Saanich Peninsula
Greater Victoria